Havana Storm is a 2014 mystery novel written by international best-selling author Clive Cussler.

Plot
The novel was Cussler's 23rd novel in his Dirk Pitt Adventure Series, and follows the adventures of Dirk Pitt, who appears in Cuba to investigate a toxic outbreak that could threaten the United States, but winds up becoming involved in a post-Castro battle for political control of Cuba.

References

Dirk Pitt novels
2014 American novels
G. P. Putnam's Sons books
Novels by Clive Cussler
Collaborative novels